was the fifth shōgun of the Ashikaga shogunate who reigned from 1423 to 1425 during the Muromachi period of Japan. Yoshikazu was the son of the fourth shōgun Ashikaga Yoshimochi.

Yoshimochi ceded power to his son, and Yoshikazu became Sei-i Taishōgun at age 18,<ref>Titsingh, ;  Screech, Timon. (2006). Secret Memoirs of the Shoguns: Isaac Titsingh and Japan, 1779–1822, p.  234 n.10; n.b., Yoshikasu (b. 1407 – named shōgun in 1423) = 18yrs.  In this period, "children were considered one year old at birth and became two the following New Year's Day; and all people advanced a year that day, not on their actual birthday."]</ref> but he would die within two years. According to Oguri Hangan ichidaiki, Yoshikazu's death was hastened by a life of drunken dissipation. His buddhist name was Chōjo'in (長得院).

In 1423, was Yoshikazu appointed shōgun. A year later the Emperor Go-Kameyama dies. Yoshikazu would rule for a brief reign as he dies in 1425 and is succeeded by his father Yoshimochi that same year. When his father died in 1428, Go-Hanazono ascends the throne in second repudiation of agreement. The sixth official shōgun became Ashikaga Yoshinori in 1429.

Era of Yoshikazu's bakufu
The years in which Yoshikazu was shōgun are encompassed within a single era name or nengō.  
 Ōei  (1394–1428)

 See also 
 East Asian age reckoning

Notes

References
 Ackroyd, Joyce I. (1982) Lessons from History: the Tokushi Yoron. Brisbane: University of Queensland Press.  ;  OCLC 7574544
 De Benneville, James S. (1915) Tales of the Samurai: Oguri Hangan ichidaiki, being the story of the lives, the adventures, and the misadventures of the Hangwan-dai Kojirō Sukeshige and Terute-hime, his wife.. Yokohama: The Fukuin Printing Co. OCLC 45027056
 Titsingh, Isaac. (1834). Nihon Ōdai Ichiran''; ou,  Annales des empereurs du Japon.  Paris: Royal Asiatic Society, Oriental Translation Fund of Great Britain and Ireland. OCLC 585069

1407 births
1425 deaths
15th-century shōguns
Yoshikazu
Yoshikazu